Carasobarbus harterti is a ray-finned fish species in the family Cyprinidae. It is found only in Morocco.

Its natural habitat is rivers. It is threatened by habitat loss.

References

Carasobarbus
Freshwater fish of North Africa
Endemic fauna of Morocco
Cyprinid fish of Africa
Fish described in 1901
Taxa named by Albert Günther
Taxonomy articles created by Polbot